{{Infobox media franchise
| color = Pink
| image = 
| caption = 
| title = The Power Universe
| creator = 
| origin = Power
| tv_series = {{plainlist|
Power
Power Book II: GhostPower Book III: Raising KananPower Book IV: Force}}
| music = "Big Rich Town" by 50 Cent & Joe
| soundtracks = Soundtracks
| years = 2014present

| owner = Lionsgate
| otherlabel1 = Executive producer
| otherdata1 = 
| website = 
| otherlabel4 = Distributor
| otherdata4 = Starz Distribution
}}

The Power Universe (or Power'' franchise), is a media franchise of an American television crime drama series created by Courtney A. Kemp in collaboration with Curtis "50 Cent" Jackson. The franchise produced one of the highest rated shows on Starz and most watched on the cable.

Television

Production

Accolades

Power

Power Book II: Ghost

Theme songs
The opening themes for all four series are songs performed by the executive producer of the show, 50 Cent.

References

External links
 

2010s American black television series
2020s American black television series
2010s American crime drama television series
2014 American television series debuts
2020 American television series endings
2020s American crime drama television series
Television series by G-Unit Films and Television Inc.
English-language television shows
Gangs in fiction
Serial drama television series
Starz original programming
Television series by CBS Studios
Television shows filmed in New York (state)
Television shows set in New York City
Television series about organized crime
Works about African-American organized crime
Works about gangs
Works about Mexican drug cartels
Works about the Serbian Mafia
Television series about prosecutors